"Donk" is the fourth single on the debut studio album souljaboytellem.com recorded in 2007 and released in 2008 by U.S. rapper and YouTuber Soulja Boy.

Remix
A remix to the song was released in mid 2008. The remix features Yung Joc.

Track listing
CD single
 "Donk"
 "Yak!"  (Wideboys Remix, Bassline Mix)

12" single
 "Donk" (Main)
 "Donk" (Instrumental)
 "Donk" (Acapella)

Samples
This song was sampled on multiple tracks:
 "Pop It 4 Pimp", by Bun B, Webbie and Juvenile. The "Yup!" and the "Shake som wit' it!" lyrics are what that song samples.
 "Itty Bitty Piggy", by Nicki Minaj

Charts

Release history

References

2007 songs
2008 singles
Soulja Boy songs
Songs written by Soulja Boy
Snap songs

fi:Donk